is a 1989 Japanese film directed by Yōichi Sai.

Awards
11th Yokohama Film Festival 
Won: Best Actor - Ryō Ishibashi
Won: Best Actress - Anna Nakagawa
Won: Best Screenplay - Hiroshi Saitō, Yōichi Sai
3rd Best Film

References

External links

Films directed by Yōichi Sai
Films set in Okinawa Prefecture
1980s Japanese films